Sagone may refer to:

 Sagone, Corsica, a town in Corsica
 Sagone (river), a river in Corsica
 Sagone, Samoa, a village on the island of Savai'i in Samoa
 Roman Catholic Diocese of Sagone, a diocese based in the city of Sagone, Corsica
 Torra di Sagone, a Genoese tower beside the Anse de Sagone in Corsica